In telecommunications, an interference is that which modifies a signal in a disruptive manner, as it travels along a communication channel between its source and receiver. The term is often used to refer to the addition of unwanted signals to a useful signal. Common examples include:

 Electromagnetic interference (EMI)
 Co-channel interference (CCI), also known as crosstalk
 Adjacent-channel interference (ACI)
 Intersymbol interference (ISI)
 Inter-carrier interference (ICI), caused by doppler shift in OFDM modulation (multitone modulation).
 Common-mode interference (CMI)
 Conducted interference

Noise is a form of interference but not all interference is noise.

Radio resource management aims at reducing and controlling the co-channel and adjacent-channel interference.

Interference alignment 
A solution to interference problems in wireless communication networks is interference alignment, which was crystallized by Syed Ali Jafar at the University of California, Irvine. A specialized application was previously studied by Yitzhak Birk and Tomer Kol for an index coding problem in 1998. For interference management in wireless communication, interference alignment was originally introduced by Mohammad Ali Maddah-Ali, Abolfazl S. Motahari, and Amir Keyvan Khandani, at the University of Waterloo, for communication over wireless X channels. Interference alignment was eventually established as a general principle by Jafar and Viveck R. Cadambe in 2008, when they introduced "a mechanism to align an arbitrarily large number of interferers, leading to the surprising conclusion that wireless networks are not essentially interference limited." This led to the adoption of interference alignment in the design of wireless networks.

Jafar explained:

According to New York University senior researcher Paul Horn:

See also 

 Distortion
 Inter-flow interference
 Intra-flow interference
 Meaconing
 Signal-to-interference ratio (SIR)
 Signal-to-noise plus interference (SNIR)

References

External links 
 Overview of interference mitigation techniques in mobile networks

Noise (electronics)
Interference
Telecommunications

fr:Interférence